Urim (lit. Lights) is a kibbutz in the Negev desert in southern Israel. Located near the border of the Gaza Strip and about 30 kilometers west of Beersheba, the kibbutz falls under the jurisdiction of Eshkol Regional Council.

History
Urim was established in  1948, on land which had belonged to the  Palestinian village of Al-Imara.  Al-Imara became depopulated in the 1948 Arab–Israeli War, and Urim was established about 1 km south of the village site. 

The community was founded in Ra'anana in 1945 by Bulgarian immigrants from the Gordonia and Maccabi Youth groups, but most of the later settlement came from North Americans from Habonim. The kibbutz itself was settled on 6 October 1946 as one of the 11 points in the Negev.

References

External links
Urim Negev Information Centre
 Personal website about Urim

Kibbutzim
Kibbutz Movement
Populated places established in 1946
Populated places in Southern District (Israel)
1946 establishments in Mandatory Palestine
Bulgarian-Jewish culture in Israel
North American-Jewish culture in Israel